Tim Settle (born July 11, 1997) is an American football defensive tackle for the Buffalo Bills of the National Football League (NFL). He played college football at Virginia Tech and was drafted by the Washington Redskins in the fifth round of the 2018 NFL Draft.

Early years
Settle attended Stonewall Jackson High School in Manassas, Virginia. He played high school football for the Raiders. As a senior, he tallied 72 tackles, three sacks, two fumble recoveries and 10 pass deflections. A five-star recruit, Settle committed to play football for the Virginia Tech Hokies in January 2015, choosing them over programs such as Louisville and USC.

College career
Settle attended and played college football at Virginia Tech under head coaches Frank Beamer and Justin Fuente. He did not play as a true freshman in 2015 and chose to redshirt.

As a redshirt freshman in 2016, Settle played in all 14 of Virginia Tech's games, recording 17 tackles (seven for loss), two quarterback hurries and one blocked kick. He was named to the ACC All-Freshman Second-Team.

In 2017, as a redshirt sophomore, he played in 13 games, tallying 36 tackles (12.5 for loss), four sacks, one pass deflection, two quarterback hurries, and one blocked kick. Following the season, he was named to the 2017 All-ACC Second-Team. On January 4, 2018, Settle decided to forgo his remaining two years of eligibility and enter the 2018 NFL Draft.

Collegiate statistics

Professional career

Washington Redskins / Football Team
Settle was drafted by the Washington Redskins in the fifth round, 163rd overall, of the 2018 NFL Draft. He made his NFL debut in the Redskins' season-opening 24–6 victory over the Arizona Cardinals. In Week 12, against the Dallas Cowboys, he recorded the first three tackles of his professional career. Settle made his first NFL start in a Week 2 loss to the Dallas Cowboys in 2019.< In Week 5 Settle sacked Tom Brady to record his first career NFL sack. Settle finished the 2020 season with a new career high of five sacks, which ranked him fourth on the team.

On December 14, 2021, Settle was placed on the COVID-19 reserve list, but reactivated a week later.

Buffalo Bills
On March 17, 2022, Settle signed a two-year contract with the Buffalo Bills.

NFL career statistics

Regular season

Postseason

References

External links

Buffalo Bills bio
Virginia Tech Hokies bio

1997 births
Living people
American football defensive tackles
Buffalo Bills players
People from Manassas, Virginia
Players of American football from Virginia
Sportspeople from the Washington metropolitan area
Virginia Tech Hokies football players
Washington Redskins players
Washington Football Team players